Moa are extinct giant flightless birds native to New Zealand. 

Moa or MOA may also refer to:  

The Polynesian word for chicken.

People
 Moa (name)
 Mohammed Abdellaoue (born 1985), Norwegian football player nicknamed "Moa"
 Moa Lignell (born 1994), Swedish singer
 Moa Kikuchi (菊地 最愛 Kikuchi Moa, born 1999), Japanese singer

Places

Islands
 Moa (Indonesia), one of the Leti Islands
 Moa Island (Queensland), in Australia

Malls
 Mall of Alnor, in Cotabato City, Philippines
 Mall of America, in Minnesota, United States
 SM Mall of Asia, in Manila, Philippines

Rivers
 Moa River, in west Africa
 Môa River, Brazil
 Moa River (Cuba), see Nuevo Mundo Dam

Towns and villages
 Moa, Cuba
 Moa, Niger
 Moa, Tanga, in Mkinga District, Tanga Region, Tanzania

Science and mathematics
 Magnetic field oscillating amplified thruster, a novel propulsion system with several terrestrial applications
 Mars Organic Analyzer
 Manner of articulation (linguistics)
 Massive Online Analysis, a free open-source software specific for data stream mining with concept drift
 Mechanism of action, the means by which a drug exerts its biological effects
 Method of administration, in medicine
 Methoxyacrylate, an inhibitor of the cytochrome bc1 complex
 Microlensing Observations in Astrophysics, a group of astrophysicists searching for exoplanets
 Migraine without aura
 Minute of arc, a term relating to angular measurement; known as Minute of Angle in firearms
 Mode of action, a field which investigates how a toxin affects an organism in vivo

Ships of the New Zealand Navy
 Moa-class patrol boat, built between 1978 and 1985
 HMNZS Moa (P3553), a patrol boat
 HMNZS Moa (T233), a minesweeper

Other
 Minute of angle, a way of determining firearm accuracy
 Making of America, a digital library project of the University of Michigan and Cornell University
 Memorandum of agreement or memorandum of understanding, an agreement between two or more parties
 Memorandum of association, a document required to incorporate a company in many Commonwealth countries
 Metal Open Air, a Brazilian heavy metal festival
 Military operations area, an area where United States military activity takes place, used on Sectional Aeronautical Charts to define boundaries for Military and Civilian Aircraft Flights
 Mine Owners' Association
 Ministry of Agriculture
 MOA Museum of Art in Japan
 Moment of Alwaysness (모아), the fan base of the group Tomorrow X Together
 Moscow Airlines, an ICAO airline designator
 Museum of Anthropology at UBC in Canada
 Jaynagarer Moa, or simply Moa, a Bengali sweet
 Psilotum nudum, also called Whisk fern, known as Moa in the Hawaiian Islands

See also
 
 Moai (disambiguation)
 Mua (disambiguation)
 Mower